Logan County is a county located in the U.S. state of Oklahoma. As of the 2010 census, the population was 41,848. Its county seat is Guthrie.

Logan County is part of the Oklahoma City, OK Metropolitan Statistical Area. Guthrie served as the capital of Oklahoma Territory from 1890 until 1907 and of the state of Oklahoma from 1907 until 1910.

History
Following the Oklahoma Organic Act of 1890, which established the Oklahoma Territory, Logan County was designated as County One, of the six counties created out of Unassigned Lands. The town of Guthrie was designated as the county seat and the capital of Oklahoma Territory. The county was named on August 5, 1890, for U. S. Senator, John A. Logan, of Illinois.

The land in what became Logan County had been settled during the 1820s and 1830s by the Creek and Seminole tribes after the forced Indian Removal by the federal government from their traditional historic territories in the American Southeast. These tribes supported the Confederate States of America during the Civil War, in part based on the CSA promise of an American Indian state if they won. The United States required the tribes that supported the Confederacy to make new Reconstruction Treaties in 1866.

As part of the treaties, the US reduced the lands of these tribes, designating certain areas as Unassigned Lands. This 2 million-acre area was reserved for years after the war as potential reservation lands for the Plains tribes, who were mostly settled in other areas. Congress passed a law in 1889, after the Indian Wars, to open the land to non-Indian settlement under terms of the 1862 Homestead Act. The land rush (or run) took place on April 22, 1889, whereby people rushed to establish homestead plots.

The three easternmost townships were added to the county in 1891, after areas of the Sac and Fox lands were also opened to non-Indian settlement, following allotment of communal lands to individual tribal households under implementation of the Dawes Act. This law resulted in massive losses of Indian land. The US classified lands remaining after allotment as "surplus" and allowed them to be sold to non-Natives.

Before 1889, the Kansas Southern Railway (later the Atchison, Topeka and Santa Fe Railway) had built a line from the Kansas-Oklahoma border to Purcell in Indian Territory. Stations built in the present Logan County were Beaver Creek (now Mulhall, Oklahoma) and Deer Creek (now Guthrie). After the land run, Guthrie, Oklahoma developed into a center of trade for the county and region, connected by railroads to other markets.

The Denver, Enid and Gulf Railroad (later the Atchison, Topeka and Santa Fe) ran from Guthrie to Enid, Oklahoma. The Choctaw, Oklahoma and Western Railroad (later the Chicago, Rock Island and Pacific Railway) ran between Guthrie and Chandler, Oklahoma, while the Missouri, Kansas and Texas Railroad ran east from Guthrie to Fallis, Oklahoma. From 1916 to 1944, the Oklahoma Railway Company interurban line ran between Guthrie and Oklahoma City.

Geography
The county lies in the Red Bed Plains physiographic area. It is drained by the Cimarron River and the smaller streams Cottonwood Creek and Ephraim Creek.

Major highways
  Interstate 35
  U.S. Highway 77
  State Highway 33
  State Highway 51
  State Highway 74
  State Highway 74C
  State Highway 105

Adjacent counties
 Garfield County (north)
 Noble County (north)
 Payne County (northeast)
 Lincoln County (east)
 Oklahoma County (south)
 Kingfisher County (west)

Demographics

As of the census of 2000, there were 33,924 people, 12,389 households, and 8,994 families residing in the county.  The population density was 46 people per square mile (18/km2).  There were 13,906 housing units at an average density of 19 per square mile (7/km2).  The racial makeup of the county was 81.6% White, 11.0% Black or African American, 2.9% Native American, 0.3% Asian, 0.1% Pacific Islander, 1.2% from other races, and 2.9% from two or more races.  2.9% of the population was Hispanic or Latino of any race.

There were 12,389 households, out of which 33.70% had children under the age of 18 living with them, 59.2% were married couples living together, 9.8% had a female householder with no husband present, and 27.4% were non-families. 23.7% of all households were made up of individuals, and 9.7% had someone living alone who was 65 years of age or older.  The average household size was 2.57 and the average family size was 3.04.

In the county, the population was spread out, with 25.5% under the age of 18, 12.0% from 18 to 24, 26.5% from 25 to 44, 23.7% from 45 to 64, and 12.3% who were 65 years of age or older.  The median age was 36 years. For every 100 females, there were 97.60 males.  For every 100 females age 18 and over, there were 92.90 males.

The median income for a household in the county was $36,784, and the median income for a family was $44,340. Males had a median income of $31,345 versus $22,677 for females. The per capita income for the county was $17,872.  About 8.7% of families and 12.9% of the population were below the poverty line, including 15.0% of those under age 18 and 13.0% of those age 65 or over.

Politics

In Presidential politics, Logan County has been a reliable Republican county. Since 1960, it has only voted twice for the Democratic candidate, in 1964 for Lyndon B. Johnson) (53-47%) and last in 1976 when it narrowly went for Jimmy Carter (50-48%). Barack Obama barely received over 1/4th of the vote in 2012. This was a poorer showing than George McGovern's 29% performance in 1972.

In Gubernatorial politics, since 1990, it has voted 4 times for the Republican (1994, 1998, 2002 & 2010) and twice for the Democrat (1990, for David Walters and 2006 for Brad Henry's reelection.

In U.S. Senatorial politics, since 1990, it has also voted Republican in every contest with the exception of David Boren's reelection in 1990, when he carried every county in Oklahoma.

Communities

Cities
 Cedar Valley
 Crescent
 Guthrie (county seat)

Towns
 Cashion
 Cimarron City
 Coyle
 Langston
 Marshall
 Meridian
 Mulhall
 Orlando

Census-designated places
 Crescent Springs
 Lovell
 Seward
 Twin Lakes

Unincorporated Communities
 * Four Counties Corner (formerly Lockridge)

Notable people
 Edward P. McCabe
 During the early 1890s, noted lawman and gunman James Masterson served as a county Deputy Sheriff for Logan County.
 Angie Debo (1890 - 1988), historian

National Register of Historic Places

Sites listed on the National Register of Historic Places:

Media
Newspaper
 Guthrie News-Leader "Serving Logan County since 1892"

References

 
Oklahoma City metropolitan area
1890 establishments in Oklahoma Territory
Populated places established in 1890